Kamal Bayramov is an Azerbaijani professional footballer who plays as a goalkeeper for Keşla in the Azerbaijan Premier League.

Club career
On 21 October 2009, Bayramov made his debut in the Azerbaijan Premier League for Ravan Baku match against Khazar Lankaran.

On 14 August 2020, Bayramov signed one-year contract with Keşla FK.

References

External links
 

1985 births
Living people
Association football goalkeepers
Azerbaijani footballers
Azerbaijan Premier League players
Ravan Baku FC players
AZAL PFK players
Zira FK players
Sabail FK players
Shamakhi FK players